A Love Affair is a 1963 novel by the Italian writer Dino Buzzati. It tells the story of an architect in Milan who falls in love with a much younger ballerina. The novel has an unusually conventional narrative style compared to many of the author's other works.

An English translation by Joseph Green was published in 1964. The novel was the basis for the 1965 film Un amore, directed by Gianni Vernuccio.

References

1963 novels
20th-century Italian novels
Italian novels adapted into films
Italian-language books
Novels set in Milan
Novels by Dino Buzzati
Arnoldo Mondadori Editore books